Elizabeth Patterson may refer to:

 Elizabeth Patterson Bonaparte (1785–1879),  first wife of Jérôme Bonaparte, and sister-in-law of Emperor Napoleon I of France
 Liz J. Patterson (1939–2018), U.S. Representative from South Carolina
 Elizabeth Patterson (actress) (1874–1966), American actress
 Elizabeth Gregg Patterson (1904–1987), American short story writer
 Elizabeth Patterson, a fictional character from Lynn Johnston's For Better or For Worse comic strip
 Elizabeth Patterson, mayor of Benicia, California
 Beth Patterson, Irish musician
 Elizabeth Patterson (artist) (born 1954), American artist
Elizabeth Akua Nyarko Patterson (born 1985), Ghanaian social entrepreneur